Cristo de la Concordia (Christ of Peace) is a statue of Jesus Christ located atop San Pedro Hill, to the east of Cochabamba, Bolivia. It is accessible by cable car, or by climbing 2,000 steps.

Construction

Construction of the statue began on 12 July 1987, and was completed 20 November 1994. It was designed by César and Wálter Terrazas Pardo, and was modeled after the statue Christ the Redeemer in Rio de Janeiro. Upon its completion, it became the largest statue of Jesus Christ in the world, surpassing the one it was modeled after. The arms span . The statue has a surface area of 2,400 sq. metres (25,833 sq. ft.). 1,399 stairs lead to a viewing area inside the arms of the statue, but visitors are only permitted to make the ascent on Sundays.

Design
It is the third largest statue in the Southern Hemisphere, after the statue of Virgen de la Paz in Venezuela, and the statue of Saint Rita of Cascia in Brazil. The left hand of the statue points to the South, and the right points to the North.

See also
 List of statues of Jesus

References

Concrete sculptures in Bolivia
Monuments and memorials in Bolivia
Colossal statues of Jesus
Buildings and structures completed in 1994
Buildings and structures in Cochabamba
Catholicism in Bolivia
1990s establishments in Bolivia